

Table

Matches

Italy vs Guatemala

Zambia vs Iraq

Zambia vs Italy

Iraq vs Guatemala

Zambia vs Guatemala

Iraq vs Italy

External links
 sports-reference

Groups
Oly
1988–89 in Italian football
1988–89 in Iraqi football
1988 in Guatemalan sport